Brnovich is a surname. Notable people with the surname include:

Mark Brnovich (born 1966), American lawyer and politician
Susan Brnovich (born 1968), American judge

See also
Brnović